Maksim Kuznetsov (born 5 April 1982) is a Russian former swimmer who competed in the 2004 Summer Olympics.

References

1982 births
Living people
Russian male swimmers
Russian male freestyle swimmers
Olympic swimmers of Russia
Swimmers at the 2004 Summer Olympics
European Aquatics Championships medalists in swimming
Universiade medalists in swimming
Universiade gold medalists for Russia